The LVG G.I, (company designation KD.VII), was a prototype German bomber aircraft built by LVG during World War I.

Design
The LVG G.I was a three-seat biplane equipped with two  Benz Bz.III engines driving handed propellers. LVG designed it as a heavy bomber under the brand designation KD.VII. Three aircraft were built, two of which were lost in accidents and the third being transferred to Idflieg in late 1916. Despite being stationed in Lance, France, the third G.I was awkward and the pilots refused to fly it. One test flight in spring 1917 ended in mishap, and the Luftstreitkräfte refused to order the G.I into production.

References

Bibliography

Biplanes
1910s German bomber aircraft
LVG G.I
Aircraft first flown in 1915
Twin piston-engined tractor aircraft